Bruno Besson (born 26 September 1979 in St. Germain-en-Laye) is a French racing driver. He has competed in such series as World Series by Nissan and the French Formula Three Championship. He won the Eurocup Formula Renault championship in 1998.

24 Hours of Le Mans results

References

External links
 Career statistics from Driver Database

1979 births
Living people
French racing drivers
Sportspeople from Saint-Germain-en-Laye
Formula Renault Eurocup drivers
French Formula Renault 2.0 drivers
Formula Palmer Audi drivers
French Formula Three Championship drivers
24 Hours of Le Mans drivers
European Le Mans Series drivers

Signature Team drivers
OAK Racing drivers